The Malpelo Ridge is an elevated part of Nazca Plate off the Pacific coast of Colombia. It is a faulted chain of volcanic rock of tholeiitic composition. The Malpelo Ridge may have originated simultaneously as Carnegie Ridge, and thus represent an old continuation of Cocos Ridge. It is thought to have acquired it present position due to tectonic movements along the Panama Fracture Zone.

References

Geology of Colombia
Underwater ridges of the Pacific Ocean
Oceanography
Hotspot tracks